The United States secretary of defense (SecDef) is the head of the United States Department of Defense, the executive department of the U.S. Armed Forces, and is a high ranking member of the federal cabinet. The secretary of defense's position of command and authority over the military is second only to that of the president of the United States, who is the commander-in-chief. This position corresponds to what is generally known as a defense minister in many other countries. The secretary of defense is appointed by the president with the advice and consent of the Senate, and is by custom a member of the Cabinet and by law a member of the National Security Council.

The secretary of defense is a statutory office, and the general provision in  provides that "subject to the direction of the President", its occupant has "authority, direction, and control over the Department of Defense". The same statute further designates the secretary as "the principal assistant to the President in all matters relating to the Department of Defense". To ensure civilian control of the military, no one may be appointed as the secretary of defense within seven years of serving as a commissioned officer of a regular military component (i.e., non-reserve) without a waiver from Congress.

Subject only to the orders of the president, the secretary of defense is in the chain of command and exercises command and control, for both operational and administrative purposes, over all service branches administered by the Department of Defensethe Army, Marine Corps, Navy, Air Force, and Space Forceas well as the Coast Guard when its command and control is transferred to the Department of Defense. Only the secretary of defense (or the president or Congress) can authorize the transfer of operational control of forces between the three military departments (Department of the Army, the Navy, and the Air Force) and the eleven Unified Combatant Commands. Because the secretary of defense is vested with legal powers that exceed those of any commissioned officer, and is second only to the president in the military hierarchy, its incumbent has sometimes unofficially been referred to as "deputy commander-in-chief". The chairman of the Joint Chiefs of Staff is the principal military adviser to the secretary of defense and the president; while the chairman may assist the secretary and president in their command functions, the chairman is not in the chain of command.

The secretary of state, the secretary of the treasury, the secretary of defense, and the attorney general are generally regarded as the four most important (and are officially the four most senior and oldest) cabinet officials because of the size and importance of their respective departments.
The current secretary of defense is retired general Lloyd Austin, who is the first African American to serve in the position.

History

An Army, Navy, and Marine Corps were established in 1775, in concurrence with the American Revolution. The War Department, headed by the secretary of war, was created by Act of Congress in 1789 and was responsible for both the Army and Navy until the founding of a separate Department of the Navy in 1798.

Based on the experiences of World War II, proposals were soon made on how to more effectively manage the large combined military establishment. The Army generally favored centralization while the Navy had institutional preferences for decentralization and the status quo. The resulting National Security Act of 1947 was largely a compromise between these divergent viewpoints. It renamed the Department of War the Department of the Army, and added both it and the Department of the Navy to a newly established National Military Establishment (NME). The Act also separated the Army Air Forces from the Army to become its own branch of service, the United States Air Force.

A new title was coined by the Act for the head of the NME: Secretary of Defense. At first, each of the service secretaries maintained cabinet status. The first secretary of defense, James Forrestal, who in his previous capacity as the secretary of the Navy had opposed the creation of the new position, found it difficult to exercise authority over the other branches with the limited powers his office had at the time. To address this and other problems, the National Security Act was amended in 1949 to further consolidate the national defense structure in order to reduce interservice rivalry, directly subordinate the secretaries of the Army, the Navy and the Air Force to the secretary of defense in the chain of command, and rename the National Military Establishment as the Department of Defense, making it one Executive Department. The position of the deputy secretary of defense, the number two position in the department, was also created at this time.

The general trend since 1949 has been to further centralize management in the Department of Defense, elevating the status and authorities of civilian OSD appointees and defense-wide organizations at the expense of the military departments and the services within them. The last major revision of the statutory framework concerning the position was done in the Goldwater–Nichols Department of Defense Reorganization Act of 1986. In particular, it elevated the status of joint service for commissioned officers, making it in practice a requirement before appointments to general officer and flag officer grades could be made.

As the secretary of defense is a civilian position intended to be independent of the active-duty leadership, a secretary is required to have been retired from service for at least seven (originally ten) years unless a waiver is approved by Congress. Since the creation of the position in 1947, such a waiver has been approved only three times, for Army general George Marshall in 1950, Marine Corps General Jim Mattis in 2017, and retired Army general Lloyd J. Austin III in 2021.

Powers and functions

The secretary of defense, appointed by the president with the advice and consent of the Senate, is by federal law the head of the Department of Defense, "the principal assistant to the President in all matters relating to Department of Defense", and has "authority, direction and control over the Department of Defense". Because the Constitution vests all military authority in Congress and the president, the statutory authority of the secretary of defense is derived from their constitutional authorities. Since it is impractical for either Congress or the president to participate in every piece of Department of Defense affairs, the secretary of defense and the secretary's subordinate officials generally exercise military authority.

As the head of DoD, all officials, employees and service members are "under" the secretary of defense. Some of those high-ranking officials, civil and military (outside of OSD and the Joint Staff) are: the secretary of the Army, secretary of the Navy, and secretary of the Air Force, Army chief of staff, commandant of the Marine Corps, chief of naval operations, Air Force chief of staff, chief of space operations, and chief of the National Guard Bureau and the combatant commanders of the Combatant Commands. All these high-ranking positions, civil and military, require Senate confirmation.

The Department of Defense is composed of the Office of the Secretary of Defense (OSD), the Joint Chiefs of Staff (JCS) and the Joint Staff (JS), Office of the Inspector General (DODIG), the Combatant Commands, the Military Departments (Department of the Army (DA), Department of the Navy (DON) & Department of the Air Force (DAF)), the Defense Agencies and DoD Field Activities, the National Guard Bureau (NGB), and such other offices, agencies, activities, organizations, and commands established or designated by law, or by the president or by the secretary of defense.

Department of Defense Directive 5100.01 describes the organizational relationships within the Department and is the foundational issuance for delineating the major functions of the Department. The latest version, signed by former secretary of defense Robert Gates in December 2010, is the first major re-write since 1987.

Office of the Secretary of Defense

The secretary's principally civilian staff element is called the Office of the Secretary of Defense (OSD) and is composed of the deputy secretary of defense (DEPSECDEF) and five under secretaries of defense in the fields of acquisition & sustainment, research & engineering, comptroller/chief financial officer, intelligence, personnel & readiness, and policy; several assistant secretaries of defense; other directors and the staffs under them.

The name of the principally military staff organization, organized under the chairman of the Joint Chiefs of Staff, is the Joint Staff (JS).

Awards and decorations
The Defense Distinguished Service Medal (DDSM), the Defense Superior Service Medal (DSSM), the Defense Meritorious Service Medal (DMSM), the Joint Service Commendation Medal (JSCM) and the Joint Service Achievement Medal (JSAM) are awarded, to military personnel for service in joint duty assignments, in the name of the secretary of defense. In addition, there is the Joint Meritorious Unit Award (JMUA), which is the only ribbon (as in non-medal) and unit award issued to joint DoD activities, also issued in the name of the secretary of defense.

The DDSM is analogous to the distinguished services medals issued by the military departments (i.e. Army Distinguished Service Medal, Navy Distinguished Service Medal & Air Force Distinguished Service Medal), the DSSM corresponds to the Legion of Merit, the DMSM to the Meritorious Service Medal, the JSCM to the service commendation medals, and the JSAM to the achievement medals issued by the services. While the approval authority for DSSM, DMSM, JSCM, JSAM and JMUA is delegated to inferior DoD officials: the DDSM can be awarded only by the secretary of defense.

Recommendations for the Medal of Honor (MOH), formally endorsed in writing by the secretary of the military department concerned and the chairman of the Joint Chiefs of Staff, are processed through the under secretary of defense for personnel and readiness, and such recommendations be must approved by the secretary of defense before it can be handed over to the president, who is the final approval authority for the MOH, although it is awarded in the name of Congress.

The secretary of defense, with the concurrence of the secretary of state, is the approval authority for the acceptance and wear of NATO medals issued by the secretary general of NATO and offered to the U.S. permanent representative to NATO in recognition of U.S. servicemembers who meet the eligibility criteria specified by NATO.

Congressional committees
As the head of the department, the secretary of defense is the chief witness for the congressional committees with oversight responsibilities over the Department of Defense. The most important committees, with respect to the entire department, are the two authorizing committees, the Senate Armed Services Committee (SASC) and the House Armed Services Committee (HASC), and the two appropriations committees, the Senate Appropriations Committee and the House Appropriations Committee.

For the DoD intelligence programs the Senate Select Committee on Intelligence and the House Permanent Select Committee on Intelligence have the principal oversight role.

National Security Council
The secretary of defense is a statutory member of the National Security Council. As one of the principals, the secretary along with the vice president, secretary of state and the assistant to the president for national security affairs participates in biweekly Principals Committee (PC) meetings, preparing and coordinating issues before they are brought before full NSC sessions chaired by the president.

Role in the military justice system
The secretary is one of only five or six civiliansthe others being the president, the three "service secretaries" (the secretary of the Army, secretary of the Navy, and secretary of the Air Force), and the secretary of homeland security (when the United States Coast Guard is under the United States Department of Homeland Security and has not been transferred to the Department of the Navy under the Department of Defense)authorized to act as convening authority in the military justice system for General Courts-Martial (: article 22, UCMJ), Special Courts-Martial (: article 23, UCMJ), and Summary Courts-Martial (: article 24 UCMJ).

Salary
Secretary of Defense is a Level I position in the Executive Schedule, thus earning a salary of US$221,400, as of January 2021.

List of secretaries of defense
The longest-serving secretary of defense is Robert McNamara, who served for a total of 7years, 39 days. Combining his two non-sequential services as the secretary of defense, the second-longest serving is Donald Rumsfeld, who served just ten days fewer than McNamara. The second-longest unbroken tenure was Caspar Weinberger's, at 6years, 306 days.

The shortest-serving secretary of defense is Elliot Richardson, who served 114 days and then was appointed U.S. attorney general amid the resignations of the Watergate Scandal. (This is not counting deputy secretaries of defense William P. Clements and William Howard Taft IV, who each served a few weeks as temporary/acting secretary of defense).

For precursors to this position prior to the establishment of the Department of Defense, see the lists of secretaries of the Navy and secretaries of war prior to 1947.

 Parties

 Status

Succession

Presidential succession
The secretary of defense is sixth in the presidential line of succession, following the secretary of the treasury and preceding the attorney general.

Secretary succession
On December 10, 2020, President Donald Trump modified the order of succession for the office of Secretary of Defense in Executive Order 13963. The order of succession is:

See also

References

Citations

General sources

Federal law
 Title 10 of the United States Code
 Title 50 of the United States Code

Directives, regulations and manuals

Further reading
 
 
 
 
 
 Mahan, Erin R., and Jeffrey A. Larsen, eds. (2012). "Evolution of the Secretary of Defense in the Era of Massive Retaliation: Charles Wilson, Neil McElroy, and Thomas Gates, 1953–1961", Cold War Foreign Policy Series: Special Study3 (September 2012), vii–41.

Primary historical sources

Online sources

External links

 

|-

1947 establishments in the United States
Defense, Secretary of
Defense
 
NATO defence ministers